Supercritical hydrolysis is a chemical engineering process in which water in the supercritical state can be employed to achieve a variety of reactions within seconds. To cope with the extremely short times of reaction on an industrial scale, the process should be continuous. This continuity enables the ratio of the amount of water to the other reactants to be less than unity which minimizes the energy needed to heat the water above , the  critical temperature. Application of the process to biomass provides simple sugars in near quantitative yield by supercritical hydrolysis of the constituent polysaccharides. The phenolic polymer components of the biomass, usually exemplified by lignins, are converted into a water-insoluble liquid mixture of low molecular phenols (monomerization).

A private company, Renmatix, based in King of Prussia, PA, has developed a supercritical hydrolysis technology to convert a range of non-food biomass feedstocks into cellulosic sugars for application in biochemicals and biofuels. It has a demonstration facility in Georgia, currently capable of processing three dry tons of hardwood biomass into cellulosic sugar daily. In Australia, a government-sponsored entity called Licella, is similarly transforming sawdust. Both processes require high ratios of water to the amount of feedstock. This energy profligacy can be avoided by the use of a plastic-type extruder through which the solid, but wet, biomass is conveyed to a small inductively heated reaction zone as shown by Xtrudx Technologies Inc of Seattle.

Supercritical hydrolysis can be considered a broadly applicable green chemistry process that utilizes water simultaneously as a heat transfer agent, a solvent, a reactant, a source of hydrogen and as a char-reduction component.

References

Ethanol Producers Magazine 2012, 18(3), 70-72
US Patent 7,955,508 June 11, 2011
US Patent 8,057,666 November 15, 2011
US Patent 8.890,143 March 17, 2015

Environmental chemistry
Green chemistry